Donny Susetyo (born 28 March 1974) is an Indonesian former professional tennis player.

Susetyo represented Indonesia in various multi-sport events during his career and played in four Davis Cup ties for Indonesia as a doubles player. He competed for Indonesia at the 1993 Universiade, won three medals at the 1993 Southeast Asian Games and two medals at the 1994 Asian Games.

While competing on the professional tennis tour, Susetyo had a best singles ranking of 677 in the world and appeared in the main draw of the 1995 edition of the Indonesia Open.

See also
List of Indonesia Davis Cup team representatives

References

External links
 
 
 

1974 births
Living people
Indonesian male tennis players
Competitors at the 1993 Summer Universiade
Southeast Asian Games medalists for Indonesia
Southeast Asian Games silver medalists for Indonesia
Southeast Asian Games bronze medalists for Indonesia
Competitors at the 1993 Southeast Asian Games
Asian Games medalists in tennis
Asian Games silver medalists for Indonesia
Asian Games bronze medalists for Indonesia
Medalists at the 1994 Asian Games
Tennis players at the 1994 Asian Games
Southeast Asian Games medalists in tennis
20th-century Indonesian people
21st-century Indonesian people